Kareda Parish was a rural municipality of Estonia, in Järva County. It had a population of 846 (2006) and an area of 91 km².

Populated places
Kareda Parish had a small borough, Peetri, and 11 villages: Ämbra, Ammuta, Ataste, Esna, Kareda, Köisi, Küti, Müüsleri, Õle, Öötla and Vodja.

External links

References

 
Populated places in Järva County